Benjamin Paul Goldfaden (September 6, 1913 – March 25, 2013) was an American professional basketball player. He played two games in the Basketball Association of America (BAA) as a member of the Washington Capitols during the 1946–47 season. Goldfaden spent most of his professional career playing in the American Basketball League. 

Goldfaden began playing basketball in Detroit during his early years due to his height. He attended South Side High School in Newark, New Jersey, where he was an all-state team selection in 1933. Goldfaden was so highly recruited during his teenage years that he was pursued by Catholic and other sectarian prep schools despite that he was Jewish. He was paid to play for barnstorming teams in exhibition games as a 16-year-old that would have marred his amateur status and disqualified him from playing college basketball. Goldfaden played collegiately for the George Washington Colonials on an athletic scholarship.
 
Goldfaden quit playing basketball at the age of 33 to become a physical education teacher as its salary of US$2,000 ($ adjusted for inflation) was better than his basketball career. He worked 20 years as an agent for Massachusetts Mutual Life Insurance and served as a city recreation director in Maryland. Goldfaden died of congestive heart failure, aged 99, in Tavares, Florida. He was believed to be the oldest living former National Basketball Association (NBA) player at the time of his death.

BAA career statistics

Regular season

References

External links

1913 births
2013 deaths
American Basketball League (1925–1955) players
American men's basketball players
Basketball players from Detroit
Basketball players from Newark, New Jersey
Forwards (basketball)
George Washington Colonials men's basketball players
Jewish men's basketball players
Malcolm X Shabazz High School alumni
Philadelphia Sphas players
Undrafted National Basketball Association players
Washington Capitols players